The sound change /f/ > /h/ and subsequently to null, complete loss, is a distinctive development of the phonological history of the Spanish language, occurring also among the Romance languages in Gascon, Aromanian, Moldavian and Transylvanian Romanian and, sporadically, other Romance languages. Under certain phonological conditions, the initial Latin /f/ came to be articulated as [h], which then disappeared in standard Spanish, although its pronunciation is preserved for some words in several varieties, especially in a large part of Andalusia, Extremadura and Spanish America (it is also maintained in dialects of transition with the Spanish language such as Cantabro and Extremaduran). The phenomenon is exemplified by a word such as Latin FARĪNA, which evolved to /aˈrina/ in Spanish (with <h> kept in the spelling harina) vs. Italian /faˈrina/ farina (all meaning 'flour').

The phoneme /f/ in Latin phonology

The place of /f/ in the consonant system 
In the original Latin words, /f/ could appear only in initial position, while in intermediate position it is present only in borrowings from other languages (e.g., RUFUS rojizo). Also in prefixed words whose second element began with a F-, this could be in an intermediate position: DE-FENDERE defender, CON-FUNDERE confundir, etc.

Was the pronunciation of /f/ really [f]? 
In addition to the above, it is possible that the sound represented by the grapheme F was not labiodental, but rather bilabial . Even if /f/ were an isolated phoneme, it could have had two allophones in pronunciation. Some researchers consider that it was only a characteristic feature developed by Spanish, due to the influence of the Indo-European languages spoken in the area where the language originated, although it was probably not the most common realization in Hispania. This hypothesis, although possible, cannot be verified either. In any case, it seems more possible that in the Ibero-Romanic dialects the most generalized pronunciation was the bilabial one.

The labiodental realization of /f/, found in French, Italian, Portuguese and Romanian, may have arisen, perhaps, by analogy of the change  > , whereby, the originally Latin semivowel /w/ — after a late articulation phase as  — consolidated into a labiodental /v/ in those languages. This latter phase of evolution, however, did not take place in the northern areas of the Iberian Peninsula, that is, assuming that if /f/ had been labiodental articulation, it would not have had a sound partner, hence it would not have conformed to the consonant system either.

Evolution of /f/ in Spanish

Possible allophones and their distribution 
The realization of the phoneme /f/ as a bilabial fricative , is quite unstable, and for this reason it tends to undergo certain changes in its phonetic realization according to the sounds with which it comes into contact. Thus, the articulation , depending on the phonological context, could have fortis or lenis realizations. It was supposed to have three allophones:

  before the velar vowels /o, u/,

  (which can also be transcribed as ) before the semivowel /w/, and

  in the other positions; that is, before the vowels /i, e, a/ and the consonants /j, l, r/.

When a phoneme has several allophones, as in this case /f/, it is always subject to potential changes in the distribution of allophones. Phonological conditions can either reinforce (e.g., preceded by a nasal /-nf-/ or followed by liquid /-fl-, -fr-/) or relax the articulation, up to a simple aspiration. In Gascon, regardless of the phonetic context, this articulation  is generalized in all positions; whereas in Spanish, only before vowels (with the exception of the diphthong 'ue' see the section on phonological context below):

 FATU > hado (also in cast.)

 FESTA > hèsta, cast. fiesta

 FILU > híu, cast. hilo or filo

 FLORE > hlor, cast. flor

 FRATRE > hray (brother), cast. fraile (fray)

 FRUCTU > heruto, cast. fruto

 CONFINE > couhí, cast. confín

 PROFUNDU > prouhoun, cast. profundo

This type of change has also taken place in other regions of Latin Europe:

 It is common in the rural dialects of Romanian, as well as in Romanian Macedonian and Megleno-Romanian: FERRU > hier (cast. hierro), FILIU > hiu (cast. hijo).
 In some areas of Calabria (south of Italy), we find h- instead of Latin F-: FABA > hava (cast. haba), FEMINA > hímmina (cast. hembra), FERRU > hierru (cast. hierro), FICU > hicu (cast. higo).
 There are occurrences also in Brescia (Lombardy, north of Italy): FAMEN > ham (cast. hambre), FEBRUARIU > hebrer (cast. febrero), FOLIA > hoja (cast. hoja).
 In certain isolated areas of Sardinia, the F- disappeared completely: FOCU > oku (cast. fuego), FUMU > ummu (cast. humo).

First written testimonies of the change in the historical Castile 
The earliest documentation attesting to the change /f /> /h/ or the complete loss of /f/ in historical Castile (including La Rioja), is from the 9th century. In one of the documents, from 863, the Latin name FORTICIUS appears in the form Ortiço; then, in another from 927, as Hortiço. From the 11th century, the number of appearances increases, and not only in Castile, but also in other territories. As can well be seen in the examples, since the change already appeared sporadically in writing, it could have been carried out much earlier in oral form.

However, it is not known with certainty whether this innovative phonic realization was the general one in the whole Castilian territory. However, no definite conclusions can be drawn until this phonetic evolution was consolidated in writing since, for centuries, aspiration was also represented by the grapheme f-. This is clearly proven in the Cantar de mio Cid, in which the preposition of Arabic language origin hasta (< ) appeared in the form fasta. At the same time, the Arabic word } the Spanish took it with the pronunciation alfombra.

Phonological context 

 FACERE > hacer
 FÉMINA > hembra
 FERRU > hierro
 FILIU > hijo
 FOLIA > hoja
 FUMU > humo
 Some exceptions, generally cultisms, are: febrero, fiebre, fiesta, filo, fin.

Prefixed words have also been subjected to evolution, as soon as speakers perceived them as such:

 OFFOCARE > ahogar
 SUFFUMARE > sahumar

 PROFECTU > provecho
 RAPHANU (< gr. ῥάφανος) > rábano

Although examples of loss also occur.

 DEFENSAM > dehesa

In Medieval Spanish, the sequence -NF- gave -f- (or -ff-): INFANTE > ifante or iffante, which later consolidated into the etymological form infante in contemporary Spanish.

The F- has been preserved before consonants, as well as before the semiconsonant  (except in Andalusia and in some dialectal areas of Spanish America, where it is pronounced as an aspirate or a velar fricative in this position); the latter is explained by having the  a labial articulation that could support the conservation as such the articulation of the also labial  or :

 FOCUS > fuego
 FONTIS > fuente
 FORTE > fuerte
 FUIMUS > fuimos
 FLORE > flor
 FRIGIDU > frío

However, there are a few examples in which the FL- group loses the initial F- (e.g., FLACCIDU > lacio) suggesting that on some rare occasions the aspiration  could, perhaps, appear; however, in most cases the f is preserved in this context (other factors are likely to have intervened here, cf. with the palatalization then losing the occlusive of the initial CL- and PL- groups).

The change /f/ > /h/ and the Basque-Latin bilingualism

Arguments in favor of the Basque substratum 
One of the most general and accepted explanations of the possible causes of the phenomenon is attributed to Ramón Menéndez Pidal, who pointed out that what initiated the change was the substratum. This is consistent with the fact that the first written traces of the change appeared in northern Castile, which was bordered by Basque-speaking areas and, even more so on the other side of the Pyrenees, in Gascony, which was also originally inhabited by peoples who spoke Basque or a similar language in Antiquity.

Although the same change took place in other regions of Latin Europe, it is only Castilian and Gascon languages in which this change has been consolidated and generalized; that is, these are two areas in which the ancient presence of Basque-Aquitanian peoples has been proven in times prior to the Roman conquests.

Objections against the substrate theories 
The theory outlined in the previous section seems quite reasonable at first glance. However, there are some objections against it. First of all, according to the knowledge available today, it is not known whether the aspirated sound  existed in medieval Basque, but it is not impossible either. In view of this uncertainty, the question may arise as to whether this  "really would have replaced the ?" (which, according to Menéndez Pidal, was definitely labiodental and not bilabial in articulation) and, on the other hand, "is it certain that Basque speakers were not able to pronounce the labiodental ? " (taking into account that in certain dialects of Basque, what was previously a fricative bilabial evolved into a labiodental  in intervocalic position). As the Basque philologist Koldo Mitxelena (1957, 126) states:

Another argument against the Basque substrate is that, in the Romance of Navarre, an area where a large number of Basque speakers lived, the initial /f/ has been preserved. Therefore, if the presence of a large Basque population had been such an important factor, one might well consider that it should have had some effect on the Romance Navarrese dialect.

Others have approached the problem with more general approaches. Since the change /f/ > /h/ also appears in other Neo-Latin language regions, why should it be related to a specific Basque substratum? Some researchers consider that if the phenomenon can be explained by internal structural causes of the language, it would not be necessary to look for additional reasons. Thus, according to Malmberg (1958; 1961, 75) if we start from the fact that the phenomenon consists in the loss of an articulatory feature, namely labiality, in certain areas isolated from the other Western Romance dialects, there must not necessarily be other causes to initiate the change.

Alternative hypotheses 
In addition to the theories mentioned above, there were professionals who analyzed the problem from more abstract aspects. For example, the Spanish philologist Gregorio Salvador presented his Geologyical hypothesis (1983), according to which the main cause of the phenomenon was that primitive Spanish speakers lost their teeth due to the absence of fluorine in the waters of Castile. Regarding his hypothesis, several hydrological analyses were even carried out in [[Castile and Aragon; however, their results revealed that there are no significant differences between the composition of the waters in the two regions in terms of their low fluoride content. In 1986 José Ramón Maruri, of the University of Navarra, reacted sarcastically to Gregorio Salvador's theory, drawing the following conclusion:

Conclusions 
The problem with the theories known to date has been that they have oversimplified the issue. The researchers, both the followers of the substratist hypotheses and their opponents, tried to explain the change with a single and simple cause, when, sometimes, a single factor is not the only one responsible for a linguistic change, but the process can be more complex.

Those who put the phenomenon in relation to the Basque substratum have not explained in detail how this could act, nor have they examined other circumstances. Of course, the use of the expression "substratum" is not very fortunate in this case, since this supposes that the evolution already took place in Roman times when the Latin conquerors settled in the Peninsula. However, from the available documents it is a clear fact that the phonetic change must have occurred around the 8th and 10th centuries, therefore it would be, perhaps, more accurate to speak of the influence of "adstratum" and not of "substrato".

At the same time, opponents of the substrate theories dismissed the possibility that bilingualism Basque-Romance had played a role in the change. Those who have tried to explain the phenomenon with more general arguments, such as that "it also appears elsewhere in Latin Europe", have not taken into account that the same phonetic evolution can be caused by different reasons in different territories.

In short, it can be said that no one has satisfactorily analyzed the complexity of the phenomenon; that is, that both Basque-Romanic bilingualism and internal structural causes of the language could have intervened in the realization of the change. Another unfortunate problem is that, although new research has been done recently and continues to be done, its results have been ignored even by the most recent linguistic publications. In conclusion, it is worth mentioning that the f- that appears in current Spanish words has been reintroduced into the language by means of cultisms and semicultisms.

See also 

 History of the Spanish language
 Phonological history of Spanish coronal fricatives
 Latin

References

Bibliography 

 

 

 

 

 

 

Spanish language
Phonetics
Language
Phonology